The 1929 Big Ten Conference football season was the 34th season of college football played by the member schools of the Big Ten Conference (also known as the Western Conference) and was a part of the 1929 college football season.

The 1929 Purdue Boilermakers football team, under head coach Jimmy Phelan, compiled an 8–0 record, won the Big Ten championship, led the conference in scoring offense (23.4 points per game), and was ranked No. 2 in the Dickinson System rankings. Fullback Ralph Welch and tackle Elmer Sleight were consensus first-team All-Americans.

The 1929 Illinois Fighting Illini football team, under head coach Robert Zuppke, compiled a 6–1–1 record, finished in second place in the Big Ten, led the conference in scoring defense (3.4 points allowed per games), and was ranked No. 5 in the Dickinson System rankings. 

The 1929 Minnesota Golden Gophers football team, under head coach Clarence Spears, compiled a 6–2 and finished in third place in the Big Ten. Tackle Bronko Nagurski was selected as the team's most valuable player and a consensus first-team All-American.

Iowa halfback Willis Glassgow won the Chicago Tribune Silver Football as the most valuable player in the Big Ten. He was also selected as a first-team All-American by Collier's Weekly, the Newspaper Enterprise Association, and the New York Sun.

Season overview

Results and team statistics

Key
DS = Rankings from Dickinson System. See 1929 college football season
PPG = Average of points scored per game
PAG = Average of points allowed per game
MVP = Most valuable player as voted by players on each team as part of the voting process to determine the winner of the Chicago Tribune Silver Football trophy

Regular season

Bowl games
No Big Ten teams participated in any bowl games during the 1929 season.

All-Big Ten players

The following players were picked by the Associated Press (AP), the United Press (UP), the Newspaper Enterprise Association (NEA), and/or Walter Eckersall (WE) as first-team players on the 1929 All-Big Ten Conference football team.

All-Americans

Four Big Ten players were selected as consensus first-team players on the 1929 College Football All-America Team. They were:

Other Big Ten players received first-team honors from at least one selector. They were:

References